The discography of Peruvian recording artist Leslie Shaw as a solo artist consist of one studio album, one extended play, and twenty-five singles. She was signed onto Zona 25 records in 2008 and became a member of the Peruvian pop girl group Glow which released one single titled Signos before Shaw decided to pursue a solo career due to her wanting to do a different genre of music. After leaving the group, Shaw changed her music style to Rock music and went on to represent Peru at the 2011 Viña del Mar International Song Festival. She made it all the way to the finals and got second place with her song Destrozado y sin control.
Since leaving the group, Shaw has had a successful career collaborating with international artist such as Thalía and Mau y Ricky. Her song Loco was certified gold in her native Perú while her songs Volverte A Ver and Decide went platinum, Si Me Ves Con Alguien went double platinum, and Faldita quadruple platinum. Her song Estoy Soltera became a hit and was named The #1 Hot Song in the Monitor Latino general charts in Perú and Mexico. The song was in collaboration with Mexican singer Thalía and Colombian singer Farina.

Albums

Studio albums

Extended plays

Singles

As lead artist

As featured artist

With Glow

References

Latin pop music discographies